Eagle Air is an airline based in Kampala, Uganda. It operates regional scheduled services and charter flights across East and Central Africa. Its main base is Entebbe International Airport, and it also maintains a second hub at Arua Airport, in the Northern Region of the country.

History
The airline was established in June 1994 and started operations in November 1994. It is owned by Tony Rubombora (62.5%), Managing Director, and Charles Muthama (37.5%), Chairman. It had over 50 employees as of March 2011.

In 2006, the airline started operations to Uganda's national parks. That same year, South Sudan banned Eagle Air from operations to the airport in Yei, alleging violations of the country's aviation regulations.

In 2008, the airline temporarily suspended operations due to a fuel shortage in Uganda, that arose out of the political violence in Kenya, following the 2007 presidential elections.

Services
Eagle Air offers scheduled and chartered flights to domestic and certain regional destinations, including air safaris to Ugandan national parks. In addition, it offers chartered flights within the East and Central Africa Region.

Destinations
According to its website, as of May 2019 Eagle Air Uganda operates regular services to the following destinations:

Fleet 
As of May 2019, the Eagle Air fleet includes:

Accidents and incidents
A 2001 Eagle Air crash in the eastern Democratic republic of the Congo, killed two Congolese rebel leaders, the Eagle Air captain, the first officer and two other individuals, for a total of six fatalities.

See also
 List of airlines of Uganda

References

External links
Website of Eagle Air Uganda
Eagle Air of Uganda route map

Airlines of Uganda
Airlines established in 1994
1994 establishments in Uganda
Organisations based in Kampala